Giada Russo (born 25 May 1997) is an Italian figure skater. A two-time Italian national champion, she has won nine senior international medals and qualified for the free skate at two ISU Championships.

Personal life
Giada Russo was born 25 May 1997 in Turin, Italy. She is studying psychopedagogy.

Career
Russo's parents, having met while skating, introduced her to the activity when she was three and a half years old. She is coached by Edoardo De Bernardis and Claudia Masoero in Turin.

In the 2011–12 season, she won the Italian national junior title and a pair of junior international medals – bronze at the 2012 International Challenge Cup and gold at the Coupe du Printemps.

2012–13 season
In 2012–13, Russo received her first ISU Junior Grand Prix (JGP) assignment and placed 13th at the event, in Chemnitz, Germany, before taking the senior bronze medal at the Italian Championships in December 2012. Making her senior international debut, Russo placed fourth at the Dragon Trophy in February 2013 and won a bronze medal in April at the Gardena Spring Trophy.

2013–14 season
Ahead of the 2013–14 season, Russo trained in Cerreto Laghi and in Los Angeles, where she received guidance from Christa Fassi. She placed tenth at her sole JGP assignment, in Mexico, and fifth at the 2014 Italian Championships. She was awarded two senior international medals, bronze at the 2014 Hellmut Seibt Memorial and Gardena Spring Trophy.

2014–15 season
Russo started the 2014–15 season at a JGP event, placing 13th in Dresden, but then competed exclusively on the senior level. After earning silver medals at the Merano Cup and Santa Claus Cup, she competed at the Italian Championships, held in Turin in December 2014. Ranked first in both programs, she won the national title by nearly 20.87 points over silver medalist Roberta Rodeghiero. She was assigned to her first ISU Championship, the European Championships, held in January 2015 in Stockholm, Sweden. Russo placed 28th in the short program, resulting in her elimination. In March 2015, she ranked 24th in the short program at the World Championships in Shanghai, allowing her to advance to the free skate. She finished 24th overall.

2015–16 season
In December 2015, Russo won her second national title by placing first in both segments and outscoring Rodeghiero by 6.26 points. At the 2016 European Championships, she qualified for the final segment by placing 12th in the short program.

Programs

Competitive highlights 
CS: Challenger Series; JGP: Junior Grand Prix

References

External links 

 
 Ice Club Torino

1997 births
Italian female single skaters
Living people
Sportspeople from Turin
Figure skaters at the 2018 Winter Olympics
Olympic figure skaters of Italy
Competitors at the 2017 Winter Universiade